HMS Meadowsweet was a  that served with the Royal Navy during the Second World War. She served as an ocean escort in the Battle of the Atlantic.

References

Sources

1942 ships
Ships built in Bristol
World War II corvettes of the United Kingdom
Flower-class corvettes of the Royal Navy